|}

The Silver Flash Stakes is a Group 3 flat horse race in Ireland open to two-year-old thoroughbred fillies. It is run at Leopardstown over a distance of 7 furlongs (1,408 metres), and it is scheduled to take place each year in July.

History
The event was formerly held at Phoenix Park in early September. For a period it was run over 7 furlongs and classed at Listed level.

The race was transferred to Leopardstown and switched to late October in 1991. It was cut to 6 furlongs in 1993, and from this point it took place in early June. It was moved to July in 1999.

The Silver Flash Stakes reverted to 7 furlongs in 2007. It was promoted to Group 3 status in 2008.

Records
Leading jockey since 1986 (4 wins):
 Michael Kinane – The Caretaker (1989), Panga (1995), Freshwater Pearl (2000), Maroochydore (2003)
 Kevin Manning – Eva Luna (1994), Desert Sky (1999), Luminata (2002), Abigail Pett (2005)

Leading trainer since 1986 (12 wins):
 Aidan O'Brien – Heeremandi (1997), April Starlight (1998), Freshwater Pearl (2000), Silk and Scarlet (2004), Cabaret (2009), Together (2010), Maybe (2011), Wonderfully (2013), Promise To Be True (2016), Happily (2017), Love (2019), Never Ending Story (2022)

Winners since 1986

See also
 Horse racing in Ireland
 List of Irish flat horse races

References
 Racing Post:

 galopp-sieger.de – Silver Flash Stakes.
 ifhaonline.org – International Federation of Horseracing Authorities – Silver Flash Stakes (2019).
 pedigreequery.com – Silver Flash Stakes – Leopardstown.

Flat races in Ireland
Flat horse races for two-year-old fillies
Leopardstown Racecourse